The Gallery of Admiral Cheng Ho is a gallery devoted to Zheng He in Malacca City, Malacca, Malaysia. It was opened in February 2003 and has been associated with the growth of tourism within the state. The gallery displays Zheng He's journey to Southeast Asia and his great legacy in international relations where he established the great affiliations between Ming Dynasty and African and Asian countries leading to prosperous and fair trade among them.

See also
 List of museums in Malaysia
 List of tourist attractions in Malacca
 Cheng Ho Cultural Museum

References

2003 establishments in Malaysia
Art museums and galleries in Melaka
Buildings and structures in Malacca City